In cryptography and the theory of computation, the next-bit test is a test against  pseudo-random number generators. We say that a sequence of bits passes the next bit test for at any position  in the sequence, if any attacker who knows the  first bits (but not the seed) cannot predict the st with reasonable computational power.

Precise statement(s) 
Let  be a polynomial, and  be a collection of sets such that  contains -bit long sequences.

We now define the next-bit test in two different ways.

Boolean circuit formulation
A predicting collection  is a collection of boolean circuits, such that each circuit  has less than  gates and exactly  inputs.

Now, we say that  passes the next-bit test if for any predicting collection , any polynomial  :

Probabilistic Turing machines

We can also define the next-bit test in terms of probabilistic Turing machines, although this definition is somewhat stronger (see Adleman's theorem). Let  be a probabilistic Turing machine, working in polynomial time. Let  be the probability that  predicts the st bit correctly, i.e.

We say that collection  passes the next-bit test if for all polynomial , for all but finitely many , for all :

Completeness for Yao's test 

The next-bit test is a particular case of Yao's test for random sequences, and passing it is therefore a necessary condition for passing Yao's test. However, it has also been shown a sufficient condition by Yao.

We prove it now in the case of the probabilistic Turing machine, since Adleman has already done the work of replacing randomization with non-uniformity in his theorem. The case of Boolean circuits cannot be derived from this case (since it involves deciding potentially undecidable problems), but the proof of Adleman's theorem can be easily adapted to the case of non-uniform Boolean circuit families.

Let  be a distinguisher for the probabilistic version of Yao's test, i.e. a probabilistic Turing machine, running in polynomial time, such that there is a polynomial  such that for infinitely many 

Let .
Then, we notice that .

We have thus:

Without loss of generality, we can assume that , with  a polynomial.

This gives us a possible construction of a Turing machine solving the next-bit test: upon receiving the  first bits of a sequence,  pads this input with a guess of bit  and then  random bits, chosen with uniform probability.

References 

Pseudorandom number generators